Walter Brugna (born 28 January 1965) is a retired professional cyclist from Italy. He won three medals at the UCI Motor-paced World Championships, including a gold in 1990. As a road cyclist, he won three stages of the Herald Sun Tour in 1987 and three stages of the Vuelta a la Argentina in 1991.

His son Alessio (b. 1995) is also a competitive cyclist.

References

1965 births
Living people
Italian male cyclists
Cyclists from the Province of Cremona
UCI Track Cycling World Champions (men)
Italian track cyclists
People from Rivolta d'Adda